The women's shot put competition of the athletics events at the 1979 Pan American Games took place on 9 July at the Estadio Sixto Escobar. The defending Pan American Games champion was María Elena Sarría of Cuba.

Records
Prior to this competition, the existing world and Pan American Games records were as follows:

Results
All distances shown are in meters.

Final

References

Athletics at the 1979 Pan American Games
1979